Esther (Hebrew: אסתר) is a 97-minute 1986 Austrian-British-Dutch-Israeli Hebrew-language independent underground dramatic historical experimental art film directed by Amos Gitai, his directorial debut. The film tells the story of Esther from the Hebrew Bible's Book of Esther and stars Simone Benyamini, Zare Vartanian, Mohammad Bakri and Juliano Mer-Khamis.

Synopsis
When King Ahasuerus (Zare Vartanian) of Persia drives out of his court Queen Vashti for refusing to show up before him, a frantic search for young virgins is unleashed throughout the kingdom, extending from India to Ethiopia. Esther, an orphan who was raised by her Jewish uncle, Mordecai (Mohammad Bakri), has entered the King's harem, having chosen her as his wife without knowing she was Jewish. At court, she has thwarted an attack against the King thanks to information provided by her uncle. For the service rendered, Esther and Mordecai have become the only free court characters not to prostrate themselves in front of anyone. However, when Mordecai refuses to bow to Minister Haman (Juliano Mer-Khamis), the latter commands the death of all of the Jews of the kingdom under the seal of the King. This is discovered by Esther and Mordecai, who devise a plan to save their people. Mordecai acts in advance against Haman ordering the vengeful extermination of all of those who want the death of the Jews.

Cast
Simone Benyamini as Esther
Zare Vartanian as Ahasuerus
Mohammad Bakri as Mordecai
Juliano Mer-Khamis as Haman
Shmuel Wolf
Rim Banna
Fouad Awad
Tarik Kopty

Production
The film marked the directorial debut of Amos Gitai, who also wrote the screenplay.

Release
The film was screened at the May 1986 Cannes Film Festival during the International Critics's Week, at the October 1986 Torino Film Festival where it also won several awards, and at the 36th Berlin International Film Festival on 21 February 1992. The film was released in Israel, where it premiered at the Tel Aviv Museum of Art, together with Berlin-Jerusalem (1989) as part of a DVD boxset in 2005.

Critical response
Stephen Holden of The New York Times opined that "[t]hough not especially entertaining, it is quite handsome and bristling with ideas." In Israel, however, some reviewers were more negative. Daniel Warth of Ha'ir, while noticing similarities to the works of Pier Paolo Pasolini, Bertolt Brecht, and Miklós Jancsó, stated that the film "is an artistic pretension which remains nothing but an aesthical drill with unsophisticated political declarations."

References
Citations in article

Sources used
. Das biblische Estherbuch zwischen Palästina und Israel. Zum Film Esther von Amos Gitai (1986) und seiner Kontextualisierung [The Biblical Book of Esther Between Palestine and Israel: On the Film Esther By Amos Gitai (1986) and Its Contextualization]. In: 
 Reprinted as “Esther” in: 
 English translation:  Reprinted as “Esther” in: 
.  Nachgedruckt in:

Further reading

.

External links
Esther at Amos Gitai’s Official Website 

1980s avant-garde and experimental films
1980s historical drama films
1986 independent films
1986 films
1980s political drama films
Austrian historical drama films
Austrian independent films
British avant-garde and experimental films
British historical drama films
British independent films
British political drama films
Cultural depictions of Esther
1986 directorial debut films
Dutch avant-garde and experimental films
Dutch historical drama films
Dutch independent films
Films about antisemitism
Films about families
Films about orphans
Films about politicians
Films about prejudice
Films about remarriage
British films about revenge
Films about revenge
Films about royalty
Films about Jews and Judaism
Films based on the Book of Esther
Films directed by Amos Gitai
Films set in ancient Persia
Films set in the 5th century BC
Films shot in Israel
Genocide in fiction
1980s Hebrew-language films
Israeli avant-garde and experimental films
Israeli historical drama films
Israeli independent films
1980s British films